Ranya Rao (born c. 1991) is an Indian actress and model who appears in South Indian films. She made her debut with the 2014 Kannada film, Maanikya.

Early life
Rao originally hails from the Chikmagalur district of the Indian state of Karnataka. After completing her schooling in Bangalore persuaded acting with accreditation in acting,.

Career
Rao was first signed by actor and director Sudeep in April 2014 for his directorial Kannada film, Maanikya. She was cast as Manasa in a supporting role, portraying a girl belonging to a rich Indian family and Sudeep's love interest. Her performance received mixed reviews from critics. A. Sharadhaa of The New Indian Express wrote, "Both Ranya and Varalaxmi play their parts well but fail to impress."

In June 2015, Rao signed her second film and first Tamil film, Wagah She is cast opposite Vikram Prabhu, her first as a female lead. In her first release of 2017, a comedy Pataki, in Kannada, she played a journalist Sangeetha, the love interest of a police officer played by Ganesh.

Filmography

References

External links
 

Living people
1993 births
21st-century Indian actresses
Indian film actresses
Actresses from Karnataka
People from Chikkamagaluru
Actresses in Kannada cinema
Actresses in Tamil cinema